Kameron Milton Allante Taylor (born October 5, 1994), is an American basketball player for Bàsquet Girona of the Liga ACB. He plays the shooting guard and small forward positions.

Early life
He was born in Hyattsville, Maryland, and his hometown is Landover, Maryland. He is 6' 6" (198 cm), and weighs 200 pounds (91 kg).

High school
In high school, Taylor played for DeMatha Catholic High School in Hyattsville.  In his senior season in 2010–11, he averaged 12 points, 8 rebounds, and 6 assists. He was All Washington Catholic Athletic Conference honorable mention.

College career 
Taylor joined Seton Hill University in Pennsylvania in 2012, where he majored in Sociology. He played for the Seton Hill Griffins in NCAA Division II and the Pennsylvania State Athletic Conference (PSAC). In his freshman year in 2012–13 he averaged 7.8 points, 4.8 rebounds, 2.0 assists, and 1.5 steals per game. He shot 41% from the floor and 70% from the free throw line.

In his sophomore year in 2013–14 he averaged 12.6 points, 6.3 rebounds, 2.6 assists, and 2.0 steals per game.  He shot 44% from the floor and 78% from the free throw line.

In his junior year in 2014–15 he was a preseason All-PSAC West selection. He averaged 13.2 points and 4.6 rebounds, 2.1 assists, and 1.0 steals per game. He shot 43% from the floor and 71% from the free throw line.

In his senior year in 2015–16, he averaged 20.8 points, 8.7 rebounds, 4.1 assists, and 2.2 steals per game.  He shot 49.6% from the floor, and 76.8% from the line. He was named National Association of Basketball Coaches All-District Second Team and First Team All-PSAC West. He graduated in the spring of 2016.

Professional career 
In 2016, after not being drafted by the any NBA team, Taylor signed with Ehingen Urspring in the ProA, the second German division. In 2016–17 for them he averaged 10.8 points, 3.9 rebounds, 2.3 assists, and 1.3 steals per game, while shooting 50.0% from the floor, 43.9% from three point range, and 80.2% from the line. In 2017 Taylor signed with Dragons Rhöndorf in the ProB, the third German division. In 2017-18 for them he averaged 23.4 points (leading the league), 7.9 rebounds, 5.6 assists (5th), and 2.6 steals (2nd) per game.

In March 2018 Taylor signed with s.Oliver Würzburg in the German Basketball Bundesliga (BBL), the country's highest level, with whom he played eight games. Then in 2018, Taylor joined Hungarian basketball team PVSK Panthers in the NB I/A, the highest level league in Hungary, averaging 19.2 points (5th in the league), 8.1 rebounds, 3.9 rebounds, and 2.2 steals (tops in the division) per game. In 2019 he then played for Brose Bamberg of the BBL and the Basketball Champions League, averaging 9.5 points and 3.8 rebounds in 12 games. Later in 2019 Taylor joined Hamburg Towers. In 2020–21 with Hamburg,  as an off-guard and point forward he averaged 14.3 points, 5.3 rebounds, 3.4 assists, and 1.5 steals (5th in the league) per game.

In July 2021, Kameron signed a one-year contract with an option for a second season with Israeli Euroleague and Israeli Basketball Premier League team Maccabi Tel Aviv. He plays the shooting guard and small forward positions for the team, and is known for his defense. On January 26, 2022, he was loaned to SIG Strasbourg of the LNB Pro A until end of the season.

On July 21, 2022, he has signed with Bàsquet Girona of the Liga ACB.

References

External links
Kam Taylor on Instagram

1994 births
Living people
American expatriate basketball people in Germany
American expatriate basketball people in Hungary
American expatriate basketball people in Israel
American men's basketball players
Basketball players from Maryland
Bàsquet Girona players
Brose Bamberg players
Dragons Rhöndorf players
Ehingen Urspring players
Hamburg Towers players
Maccabi Tel Aviv B.C. players
People from Hyattsville, Maryland
People from Landover, Maryland
Point guards
PVSK Panthers players
S.Oliver Würzburg players
Seton Hill Griffins
Shooting guards
SIG Basket players